Andre Begemann and Daniel Masur were the defending champions but chose to defend their title with different partners. Begemann partnered Albano Olivetti but lost in the semifinals to Lloyd Glasspool and Harri Heliövaara. Masur partnered Julian Lenz but lost in the semifinals to Zdeněk Kolář and Andrea Vavassori.

Kolář and Vavassori won the title after defeating Glasspool and Heliövaara 6–3, 6–4 in the final.

Seeds

Draw

References

External links
 Main draw

Maia Challenger - Doubles